This is a list of characters from the film series American Pie consisting of American Pie (1999), American Pie 2 (2001), American Wedding (2003), American Pie Presents: Band Camp (2005), American Pie Presents: The Naked Mile (2006), American Pie Presents: Beta House (2007), American Pie Presents: The Book of Love (2009), American Reunion (2012), and American Pie Presents: Girls' Rules (2020). Noah Levenstein, played by Eugene Levy, has appeared in eight of the nine released films. Biggs, Hannigan, Scott, Nicholas, Thomas, Coolidge, Cho, Isfield, Cheek, and Owen all play their characters in four films each; other characters appear in fewer films.

Characters from American Pie

Noah Levenstein

Noah Levenstein, also known as "Jim's Dad", has appeared in eight of the nine films to date, being absent only in American Pie Presents: Girl's Rules. At the 2000 American Comedy Award, Levy was nominated for Funniest Supporting Actor in a Motion Picture although he didn't win. At the 2000 Blockbuster Entertainment Award he was nominated for Favorite Supporting Actor – Comedy, which he won. At the 2002 Canadian Comedy Awards he was nominated for Pretty Funny Male Performance for his role in American Pie 2 and won the award.

He first appears in American Pie where he attempts to offer sexual advice including purchasing and giving his son Jim pornography after finding him masturbating with a tube sock. He later finds Jim humping a pie after being previously told that third base feels like "warm apple pie". He later helps Jim cover the incident up and lies to his wife about the missing pie and where it has gone, telling her he ate it.

He reappears in the second film of the series where he takes Jim to the hospital after Jim decides to turn on a porn film that Stifler rented, but accidentally uses superglue instead of lubricant to masturbate, permanently gluing his entire hand to his penis and boxer shorts. He then supports Jim after he learns that he won't be able to have sex for at least a whole week, the same amount of time before the party he is attending with Nadia, with whom he plans on sleeping, will be held.

In the third installment Noah arrives at the restaurant Jim is at to give him the wedding ring he was going to use to propose to girlfriend Michelle. Jim tries to hide the fact that he is being fellated. Not knowing Michelle is under the table, Jim's dad expresses his excitement at the proposal. Then, after Michelle bumps her head under the table in shock at hearing about the proposal, all chaos ensues as Jim ends up exposed and has to hike his pants up quickly. Saving face, he swallows what is left of his pride and asks Michelle to marry him, and then gets an erection. She readily agrees.

He appears in the fourth film, "American Wedding" (2003).

In the first spin off film from the main series, "American Pie Presents: Band Camp" (2005), he is the camp's MACRO (Morale And Conflict Resolution Officer); he recommends that Matt Stifler start trying to fit in and earn the band's trust.

He appears again in the fifth installment, in which he is presiding over the annual Naked Mile run.

He appears in the sixth film, in which he is the Beta alumni and the last-winning team captain of the Greek Olympiad. He helps to host the competition, which includes competing to remove girls' bras the fastest, a light saber duel and catching a greased pig. The final challenge being to hold off from ejaculation while receiving a lap dance. After the Betas win, Noah, as the officiate, hands over the golden hammer to Dwight.

In the seventh film, he plays a significantly smaller role, as he is not seen until near the end of the movie. He is revealed to have created "The Bible" (The Book of Love) while at college. After the book is destroyed, Rob, Nathan and Lube track him down to help recreate it, in which he assists them with and helps the group to recreate the manual.

In American Reunion (2012), it is revealed that his wife (i.e., "Jim's Mom") has died three years prior to the events portrayed in the film, and that he is still grieving her loss. In the end, he finds new love with "Stifler's Mom".

James "Jim" Levenstein

James Emmanuel "Jim" Levenstein is the main protagonist in three out of the four primary films in the American Pie series (the exception being American Wedding). He is an awkward everyman who wants to lose his virginity. He first appears in American Pie, where he is trying to lose his virginity before the end of high school and begins to pursue Czech exchange student Nadia. Stifler persuades him to set up a webcam in his room so that they can all watch it together. The plan backfires, though, when Nadia discovers Jim's pornography collection and sits half-naked on his bed to read it. Jim is forced to return to his room, where he joins Nadia, unaware that he accidentally sent the weblink to the entire school directory. As Nadia is preparing to have sex with him, he prematurely ejaculates twice, humiliating himself live in front of the entire school. Shortly afterwards Nadia leaves school and goes back home, now leaving Jim completely dateless for prom and ruining his chances of securing a date. Out of panic, Jim asks band geek Michelle Flaherty to the senior prom as she is apparently the only girl at his school who did not see what happened. He succeeds in getting Michelle into bed where she behaves aggressively before leaving him to wake up alone. The film ends with Jim and his friends eating breakfast before toasting to the next step.

Jim reappears in American Pie 2 where he and his friends rent a house at Lake Michigan in the summer break at the end of their freshman year. After keeping in contact with Nadia, who is traveling across the US, Nadia agrees to join Jim at his beach party. When Jim decides to turn on a porn movie that Stifler rented, he accidentally uses superglue instead of lubricant to masturbate, permanently gluing his entire hand to his penis and boxer shorts. Shocked and frightened, he takes out the porn cassette but ends up bonding the cassette to his other hand. Unable to open any doors, he climbs out of a window and stumbles onto the rooftop where he is caught by police officers. He is supported at the hospital by his father Noah, where he learns the news that he won't be able to have sex for at least a whole week, the same amount of time before the party is due to occur. When Nadia turns up earlier than expected, Michelle acts as his fake girlfriend so that he won't have to have sex with Nadia until his penis has healed. At the party Jim has an epiphany and realizes that it isn't Nadia he loves but Michelle. Nadia is upset that Jim chose a geek over her, but is happy for Jim and allows him to go and find Michelle, performing at band camp. He gatecrashes the performance with a trombone, just like he did before, but with much more style and confidence, and romantically makes out with Michelle in front of the cheering crowd.

In American Wedding, Jim plays a supporting role with much less screen time in comparison to the first two films and Reunion. In the opening scene, he proposes to Michelle after a few problems in attempting. She enthusiastically agrees. Jim is worried about dancing at the wedding, but salvation comes in the form of Steve Stifler, who promises to teach Jim in return of a wedding invite. Jim reluctantly agrees much to the rest of the guests disappointment. Stifler also takes charge of the bachelor party but unfortunately collides the dates with the day Jim was supposedly setting up a dinner to impress Michelle's parents. Although it appears all is ruined, Stifler and Finch cover for Jim and thankfully get the Flaherty's blessing. Scared on the days building toward the wedding, Jim shaves his pubic hair in an attempt to impress Michelle even further. However, disaster strikes as his pubes inadvertently fall into the air conditioning covering their wedding cake. A new one is made and Jim encounters another embarrassing heart-heart with his father. On the day of the wedding, Jim announces his appreciation and love for his friends Paul Finch, Kevin Myers and Steve Stifler and then happily marries Michelle.

In Band Camp, Noah Levenstein informs Stifler's younger brother Matt of Michelle's pregnancy revealing that the character is to become a father. Jim is mentioned again as Noah attempts to comfort Matt, who was caught attempting to masturbate using an oboe, informing him that he caught his son engaging in sexual activity with a pie.

Naked Mile also alludes to Jim's paternity as Noah proudly informs Erik, Steve and Matt's younger cousin, that Michelle successfully gave birth.

Whilst absent from the film, The Book of Love shows Jim's signature in the East Great Falls Bible, referencing the events of the first film.

Jim returns in American Reunion, once again the protagonist, played by Jason Biggs. He and Michelle now have a 2-year-old son named Evan. The couple's sex life has been slowly deteriorating after the birth of their son. Throughout the film, they try to re-ignite their sexual flames. Also, Jim must avoid the advances of Kara, an 18-year-old girl he once babysat when she was young, who wants to lose her virginity to him. Seeing how her situation mirrors his own when he was her age in the original film, Jim teaches her that it is best if she waits for someone special.

Michelle Flaherty

Michelle Annabeth Flaherty first appears in American Pie as a supporting character. Jim asks her to the prom as she pretends to be the only person in the school who has not seen the video of Jim prematurely ejaculating. After the prom, Jim loses his virginity to Michelle, who proves to be surprisingly aggressive in bed, and she later leaves him to wake up alone. He quickly gets over being upset as he is excited about being "used".

Michelle reappears in American Pie 2 in a much larger role. Here, her friendship with Jim grows over the summer and eventually she begins to fall in love with him. She explains that she didn't ditch Jim the morning after prom intentionally. It was done out of fear of rejection as she thought the date was over and was worried that Jim would have done the same to her. She later pretends to be Jim's girlfriend so he won't have to have sex with Nadia until his sore penis has healed. She stages a break up in front of Nadia who later goes to the party with Jim. However, Michelle is upset about Jim's interest in Nadia as opposed to her. Jim later realizes his love for Michelle, and decides to just be friends with Nadia. He goes to find Michelle at band camp, and gatecrashes the performance with a trombone and confidently kisses Michelle in front of a supportive crowd, therefore beginning a relationship with her.

In American Wedding, Michelle and Jim have continued dating and she accepts Jim's offer of marriage at the beginning of the film. Michelle settles on a dress but it is only made by one particular dressmaker so Jim and his friends set out to find him for her. Michelle and Jim's plans are almost ruined when Stifler turns up to the engagement party although they had planned to not invite him. After several misadventures, including one with the flowers being killed which Stifler later fixes, Michelle and Jim marry.

Band Camp revealed that after the events of American Wedding, Michelle became an annual MACRO at Tall Oaks Band Camp. However, she could not attend in the 2005 semester as she was heavily pregnant with Jim's baby. She requested that Noah, Jim's father, take her place, a request he received with much pride. In Naked Mile, Noah informs Erik Stifler that she had in fact given birth to a baby, to which he announced was a happy occasion.

Michelle appeared in American Reunion.

Steve Stifler

 Portrayed by Seann William Scott
 Appeared in: American Pie, American Pie 2, American Wedding, and American Reunion
Steven "Steve" Stifler, commonly referred by his last name Stifler or his nickname The Stifmeister, made his first appearance in American Pie, in which he went to East Great Falls High. He was involved with sports where he played football and lacrosse. While not part of the sex pact, Stifler plays a crucial role in the film in two ways: (1) his post-prom party served as the setting for the film's final act, and (2) he is also a close friend of the guys, especially fellow lacrosse player Chris "Oz" Ostreicher and Jim Levenstein. Despite his love-hate friendship with Paul Finch, it is apparent that they are still great friends. After Finch pays to have positive rumors about himself spread to all the girls in the school, one of these being that he won in a fist fight with Stifler, Stifler humiliates Finch in front of everyone by putting very strong laxative in Finch's habitual drink of mocha cappuccino. Finch, who is too uptight to use the school toilet until that time, then runs to the restroom, where Stifler helpfully holds the door open for him. It turns out to be the ladies' restroom, and Finch is publicly embarrassed. Stifler is also on the wrong end of the first of three particularly distasteful sight gags throughout the film's trilogy, where in this movie, he ingests beer containing semen. He then proceeds to vomit uncontrollably on a girl he was trying to seduce, and in the toilet. Stifler later catches his mother, Jeanine, and Finch having sex, and loses consciousness under the shock. This incident further ignites the frenemy relationship between Finch and Stifler.

Stifler's second appearance was in the sequel, American Pie 2 (2001), with a much larger role this time. After returning from his first year at Michigan State University with Oz, Stifler attempts a reunion party at his home, which is shut down thanks to the neighbors calling the police. He helps chip in cash to rent a beach house on Lake Michigan with the rest of the group. During the summer, Stifler becomes interested in two owners of a neighboring house that they were hired to paint: two females whom Stifler mistakenly regards as lesbians. As Stifler, Jim, and Finch sneak into their room, they respond to Stifler's attraction by offering to engage in varying degrees of lesbian sexual activities in front of Stifler, Jim and Finch, but only in exchange for the guys to engage in a corresponding degree of homoerotic acts that the girls enjoy watching. The first is Stifler grabbing Finch's buttocks, the second is Stifler and Jim french kissing, and the third one would have been for Stifler to receive a hand job from either Finch or Jim, which Stifler is the only one confident enough to do. However this freaks out Jim and Finch too much and they run off. This annoys Stifler, as the more the guys would have done, the more the girls would have done. At the main party at the beach house at the end of the film, the two girls arrive, telling Stifler they never said they were lesbians, and Stifler ends up in bed with them both.

In American Wedding, Stifler is the main protagonist. He is revealed to have become a high school football assistant coach; he also drives the team's bus. He drops in on Jim and Michelle's engagement party, much to their dismay. He is also implicated in an unusual Jim-plus-two-dogs foursome. He competes with Finch for the heart of Cadence, Michelle's younger sister. He impersonates Finch's refined and polite personality in order to win Cadence over, but Finch continues the triangle by replicating Stifler's outrageous frat boy image, which Cadence surprisingly enjoys just as much, if not more. Nevertheless, Stifler manages to bond with Cadence's family, and is eventually charged with holding Michelle's wedding ring. However, the family dog manages to ingest the ring while it is in Stifler's care, and Stifler follows it until it defecates. Stifler picks up the ring which is encapsulated within the feces using a confection paper, which Cadence's mother sees and assumes it to be one of the truffles. She insists that Stifler let her have it, but knowing he could blow his chances with Cadence for good, he suddenly devours the dog dropping into his own mouth. This carries on the tradition of rather distasteful gags where Stifler ingests various bodily substances once in each movie. Before the wedding, Stifler accidentally destroys the massive flower arrangement Michelle's family had ordered, resulting in everyone turning against him. Jim tells him to leave, and seeing how no one is on his side, Stifler complies. However, Stifler redeems himself at the end of the film: using the football team as his minions, Stifler uses his own money to buy up the entire content of a nearby flower shop and has the football team successfully set up the flowers for the wedding hours before it is to occur. By doing this, Cadence eventually falls for him and invites him to have sex in the closet. Upon following this invitation, Stifler accidentally has sex with Jim's grandmother, who was put there by John and Justin because she was "being a bitch". When Finch and Kevin go to collect her from the closet, they catch Stifler having sex with Jim's grandmother. Horrified by this, Stifler asks them to close the door and screams out. At the wedding, Finch taunts Stifler by whispering "grandmother fucker". Stifler retorts with "Well, you're a mother fucker", to which Finch agrees "Yes. yes I am." At the reception, Stifler dances with Cadence and congratulates his friend, Jim.

In Band Camp, the audience are told that Stifler has become a pornographic movie director. This movie shows that although the jocks and other popular kids pretended to like Stifler he was not liked by anyone in high school, which led Matt to reform his ways. In The Naked Mile, he is mentioned in passing by his cousin Erik as one of the legendary Stifler boys. A picture of him can be seen on Erik's noticeboard.

In American Reunion, he is portrayed in a slightly lighter fashion and can be considered somewhat of a tragic character. He now works as a temp at an investment firm, having to put up with humiliating verbal abuse from his cold-hearted employer. He yearns for the days of his youth and has trouble coping with the fact that things will never be the way they were before. Throughout the film, he attempts to re-create his teenage years (such as seeking revenge on a group of mean-spirited teens and throwing one of his trademark parties) but fails each time as his friends and everyone else have outgrown this. When Stifler learns Finch was arrested for stealing his boss' motorcycle, he finds it hilarious and believed he got his revenge on Finch because he slept with Jeanine (Stifler's mom) in the past. Meanwhile, Jim, Oz and Kevin are angered by Stifler's lack of tolerance towards their friend and rally to Finch's side. During a heated argument with the guys, Jim, Oz and Kevin reveal they don't like having Stiffer around because he always ruins their plans. Stifler is devastated and decides to skip the reunion. However, the guys soon realize how much they mean to Stifler, and how much he means to them, so they locate him at work and make amends with him. He regains his confidence and quits his job (but not before standing up to his boss). The guys proceed to attend the reunion, finally embracing Stifler as one of their own. Stifler catches up with Chuck "Sherminator" Sherman, and feeling regretful for how he treated him in high school, Stifler wholeheartedly helps Sherman find a woman to score with. In a surprise turn of events, he meets Finch's gorgeous mother and finally has his revenge by having sex with her on the lacrosse field as the MILF Guys, John and Justin, happily watch. In the end, the five friends all promise to stay in touch and meet up at least once a year from now on to catch up.

Kevin Myers
 Portrayed by Thomas Ian Nicholas
 Appeared in: American Pie, American Pie 2, American Wedding, and American Reunion
Kevin Myers first appears in American Pie as the suave leader of the pack, and he is the friend of Jim Levenstein, Chris "Oz" Ostreicher, Paul Finch, and Steve Stifler, and the boyfriend of Vicky. The four friends make a pact to lose their virginity before they graduate from high school. Vicky later accuses Kevin of being with her only for sex, and he must try to repair his relationship with her before the upcoming prom night, when the four plan to lose their virginity. He eventually succeeds. At the prom, everything seems hopeless for the four boys until Vicky asks the girl that Chuck Sherman claimed to have bedded about her first time. She proclaims to everyone at the prom that she and Sherman did not have sex at Stifler's party, leaving Sherman humiliated and making him wet himself. The revelation takes the pressure off of Jim, Kevin, Oz and Finch, and they head to the post-prom party with new hope. At the after-party at Stifler's house, all four boys fulfill their pledge. Kevin and Vicky have sex in an upstairs bedroom. Vicky breaks up with Kevin afterwards on the grounds that they will drift apart when they go to college, with him attending the University of Michigan and her at Cornell University. The morning after the prom Jim, Kevin, Oz, and Finch eat breakfast at their favorite restaurant where they toast to the future.

Kevin reappears in American Pie 2 where he, Jim, Oz and Finch return to their hometown in East Great Falls, Michigan, for the summer break after their first year of college. They attend a party hosted by Stifler, but not only does their new status as college students not give them any success with local girls, but the police also shut down the party. Kevin also has problems when he meets Vicky after their year away from each other; Vicky wants to be friends and Kevin is love-sick for her, but worried he will lose her completely. Desperately he calls his brother for advice, who tells him to move down to the beach and party hard. Together, they set off for a rented house by the beach in Grand Harbor, Michigan, where they intend to spend the whole summer, but Kevin is forced to invite Stifler along as well in order to successfully cover the costs. Kevin finds the boys jobs working as painters and decorators for a nearby house. The boys then plan to throw a huge summer party at the house, bigger than anything they've done before. The party begins at the beach house. Kevin sees his ex-girlfriend Vicky but is devastated when he sees her with a new boyfriend and leaves to go to the beach by himself. Oz, Finch and Jim follow him down, where he admits to them that he never got over Vicky and that with the party, he was hoping to relive his senior year prom night, in particular, sleeping with Vicky at the end of it. The others help Kevin realize that it will never happen, and the quartet return to the beach house to party hard.

In the third film he reappears in a much smaller role, with no significance to the plot, in contrast to the first two and latter films. As a groomsman, he aids Jim in finding the wedding dress Michelle finally settles on after long hours of searching which is made by only one designer working for one store, so Jim, Kevin and Finch, with Stifler tagging along sets out to find the dressmaker for her. They go to Chicago looking for her and end up in a gay bar. Stifler has a dance-off to make up for his meanness towards a man, Mr. Belvedere, who knows the dressmaker. In the meantime Stifler arranges a bachelor party for everyone at Jim's house except Jim who unknowingly has arranged a "special dinner" for Michelle's parents before the wedding. Kevin, Finch, and Stifler are then introduced to Fraulein Brandi and Officer Krystal by Mr. Belvedere and then play submissive and dominant roles with them respectively. While this is going on, Jim enters the house and Michelle's parents are badly embarrassed. Notably, he is absent from the wedding reception.

It is noted on the DVD commentary that most of Kevin's scenes were cut from the final edit, which implies he played a more relevant role than the one shown in the final cut.

In American Reunion, Kevin has lost contact with all his former friends; apart from Jim. The two have a conversation about going to the reunion, with Kevin being very excited. He is working as an architect from home, and is married to a woman named Ellie. His life now consists of watching shows like Real Housewives and Desperate Housewives. Kevin and the others meet at a bar, where they browse through the yearbook and find Kevin's quote, "Kevin Myers hopes to still be living it up with the beautiful Vicky Lathum." The next day, they all go to the beach, and Kevin and Vicky run into each other. They're still friends, and there appears to be no romantic feelings between the two of them. They go to the falls and chat to each other, getting drunk. The next morning, Kevin wakes up beside Vicky, wearing nothing but his underwear. He worries and leaves, thinking the two of them engaged in sexual intercourse. At Stifler's party, Kevin rings his wife, but Vicky enters the room. He confronts Vicky, but she says they didn't have sex and that she took his clothes off because he fell in the lake. She is angry at Kevin that he would have such low expectations about her. He fights outside against A.J. and his friend, and puts up a decent fight. When Finch is taken by the police, Kevin passionately tries to stop them by saying Finch didn't steal the motorcycle. Kevin and Vicky reconcile at the reunion, and the two of them and Ellie dance together. He is last seen at Dog Years with the others, and they all agree to meet up at least once a year from now on.

Paul Finch

 Portrayed by Eddie Kaye Thomas
 Appeared in: American Pie, American Pie 2, American Wedding, and American Reunion
Paul Finch, commonly referred by his surname Finch, first appears in American Pie as a mochaccino-drinking sophisticate and he is the friend of Jim Levenstein, Kevin Myers and Chris "Oz" Ostreicher. He is a member of The nerdy four friends make a pact to lose their virginity before they graduate from high school. Finch, meanwhile, pays Vicky's friend Jessica $200 to spread rumors around the school of his sexual prowess, hoping that it will increase his chances of success. Unfortunately, he runs into trouble when Stifler, angry that a girl turned him down for the prom because she was waiting for Finch to ask her, puts a laxative into Finch's mochacchino. Finch, being paranoid about the lack of cleanliness in the school restrooms, and unable to go home to use the toilet as he usually does, is tricked by Stifler into using the girls' restroom. Afterward, he emerges before many other fellow students, humiliated and is left dateless. At the prom, everything seems hopeless for the four boys until Vicky asks the girl that Chuck Sherman claimed to have bedded about her first time. She proclaims to everyone at the prom that she and Sherman did not have sex at Stifler's party, leaving Sherman embarrassed and making him wet himself. The revelation takes the pressure off of Jim, Kevin, Oz and Finch, and they head to the post-prom party with new hope. At the after-party at Stifler's house, all four boys fulfill their pledge. Finch strays downstairs to the basement recreation room where he meets Stifler's mother, Jeanine. She is aroused by his precociousness, and they have sex on the pool table. In the morning Stifler enters the room, realizes that his mom has had sex with Finch and faints, unable to believe that his mom and "shitbreak" are together. The morning after the prom Jim, Kevin, Oz, and Finch eat breakfast at their favorite restaurant where they toast to the future.

Paul reappears in American Pie 2, where he, Jim, Kevin, Oz, and Stifler return to their hometown in East Great Falls, Michigan for the summer break after their first year of college. They attend a party hosted by Stifler, but not only does their new status as college students not give them any success with local girls, but the police also shut down the party. After arriving in Grand Harbor, Kevin finds them work as painters and decorators for a house nearby. Stifler is intrigued by the two female owners, who appear to be lesbians, and excitedly breaks into their house while they're away. Jim and Finch follow him, trying to get him out, but they are caught by the owners, who relent on calling the police. But after Stifler identifies his interest in their homosexuality, they insist on the boys performing "like for like" homosexual acts on each other in return for being able to watch the girls do the same thing. Oz and Kevin take turns watching up a ladder and listening on the walkie-talkie also in the room. The conversation is accidentally picked up and heard by many other people in the neighborhood. After this, the boys plan to throw a huge summer party at the house, bigger than anything they've done before. Finch has become involved in the sexual art of Tantra, and claims that through Tantric sex, he can "make an orgasm last for days". He is waiting patiently for Jeanine, hoping she will show up and be willing to have sex with him again. He thinks she arrives when a vehicle turns up after Stifler is talking on the phone, but it turns out to be Stifler's little brother Matt. Finally, the party begins at the beach house. Kevin sees his ex-girlfriend Vicky but is crushed when he sees her with a new boyfriend and leaves to go to the beach by himself. Oz, Finch and Jim follow him down, where he confides in them that he never got over Vicky and that with the party, he was hoping to relive his senior year prom night, in particular, sleeping with Vicky at the end of it. The others help Kevin realize that it will never happen, and the quartet return to the beach house to party hard. The morning after the party, a Mercedes coupe with darkened windows turns up at the house. Finch approaches to see Jeanine who has finally turned up. It doesn't take long before Finch gets into the car and drives off to the lakeside to have hard sex with her.

In the third film, Finch plays a larger role. He helps Jim find the wedding dress Michelle finally settles on after long hours of searching which is made by only one designer working for one store, so Jim, Kevin and Finch, with Stifler tagging along sets out to find the dressmaker for her. They go to Chicago looking for her and end up in a gay bar. Stifler has a dance-off to make up for his rudeness towards a man, Bear, who knows the dressmaker. In the meantime Stifler arranges a bachelor party for everyone at Jim's house except Jim who unknowingly has arranged a "special dinner" for Michelle's parents before the wedding. Kevin, Jim and Stifler are then introduced to Fraulein Brandi and Officer Krystal by Bear and then play submissive and dominant roles with them respectively. While this is going on, Jim enters the house and Michelle's parents are badly embarrassed. Michelle's sister Cadence attends the wedding, and Finch is quickly attracted to her. Stifler also becomes attracted to her. Upon hearing that Cadence is hoping to attract a decent guy, Stifler adopts a more meek attitude and acts like Finch, and avoids swearing and speaks of philosophy. But when Finch realizes that Cadence is beginning to tire of the intellectual Stifler, Finch acts immature, rude, and perverted: in other words, like Stifler. Stifler unintentionally kills the flowers the night before the wedding, and when arguing with Finch he is heard by Cadence, who realizes his true intentions. Later, Stifler realizes that he actually feels bad about his previous actions, prompting him to bring in the football team he coaches to set up the entire room with new flowers. Ultimately, Cadence chooses Stifler, and Finch admits that Stifler was probably better for her anyway. Due to a confusion, Stifler has sex with Jim's grandmother, who opposed the wedding but is so happily distracted by this to no longer argue. Michelle and Jim eventually get married. At the reception, Finch is sitting by himself when Stifler's mom arrives. They tell each other they are over each other but at the end of the movie it shows Stifler's mom and Finch in the tub having sex. The two MILF guys are watching in awe through the window as Finch goes under the bubbles to perform oral sex on her.

In American Reunion, Finch is an assistant manager at Staples but is often disrespected by his boss. Having had enough, he steals his boss's motorcycle when he does not receive a raise that was promised to him and takes it out for a joy ride. Finch is arrested for the whole thing when the cops show up. Stifler finds the whole thing funny and believes he has gotten his revenge on him for having sex with his mother. Disgusted with his antagonistic attitude, Jim, Oz and Kevin rally to Finch's side and tell Stifler off. He meets and falls in love with Selena when he sees they have a lot in common. Finch makes amends with Selena for lying, and they have sex in the bathroom, which promises to lead to an ongoing relationship; in the process, Finch realizes that he has moved on from Stifler's mom. He decided to go see the world with Selena. Before leaving, Finch learns that Stifler had sex with his mom, Rachel, and feels a similar disgust towards his behavior (akin to the previous times he had sex with Jeanine).

Chris Oz Ostreicher

 Portrayed by Chris Klein
 Appeared in: American Pie, American Pie 2, and American Reunion
Christopher Russell "Oz" Ostreicher first appears in American Pie as a member of the high school lacrosse team and as a friend of Jim Levenstein, Kevin Myers, Steve Stifler, and Paul Finch. He is a member of The nerdy and geeky four friends make a pact to lose their virginity before they graduate from high school. Oz joins the jazz choir in an effort to lose his reputation as an insensitive jock and find a girlfriend there. Even though he was never an insensitive jock and he hangs the core three who are the biggest geeks of all time that didn't exactly get him in the popular seat. He soon wins the attention of Heather, a girl in the choir. However, he runs into problems when Heather comes to learn about Oz's reputation and subsequently breaks up with him, although he later manages to regain some of her trust. Heather sees the real Oz, not just some arrogant jock that people labeled as and see his real friends. Oz confesses the pact to Heather, and renounces it, saying that just by them being together makes him a winner. They reconcile and wind up making love together on the porch. Oz, honoring his newfound sensitivity, never confesses to what they did. The morning after the prom Jim, Kevin, Oz, and Finch eat breakfast at their favourite restaurant where they toast to the future.

In American Pie 2 he reappears where he and his friends rent a house at Lake Michigan in the summer break at the end of their freshman year where they plan to have a party. Oz is lonely and missing his girlfriend Heather who is away in Spain. They start having erotic phone sex to vent some of their frustration, but keep getting interrupted by various people. Stifler kept annoyingly assume she might be having sex with other guys while she is in Spain and suggests that he should get laid with other girls but he refused to be unfaithful towards Heather. However, Oz briefly showed some unfaithfulness when he and Kevin attempted to peek on the two girls performing sexual acts on each other at the house they were working as their summer jobs. Heather turns up to Oz's delight later at the party.

He does not reappear in the third film, American Wedding, although he would have been highly likely to attend Jim and Michelle's wedding, since he was one of the five original boys. His absence is not explained in the released cut of the film, but in a deleted scene, it is mentioned that he and Heather are in Spain. The natural assumption is then that Oz and Heather could not fly back in time for the wedding, since Jim decided to have it as soon as possible to accommodate Jim's grandmother.

Like the majority of the other characters (excluding Jim's Dad, Matt Stifler, and The Sherminator), Oz does not appear in any of the spin-off films, but his name can be seen on the check-out card for "The Bible" in The Book of Love.

He is re-introduced into the series in American Reunion. He is now a successful, wealthy sportscaster, but is best known for his embarrassing loss to Gilbert Gottfried on Celebrity Dance-Off. Despite his fame and fortune, he is still not truly happy, as he and Heather are no longer together, since she broke up with him before heading to medical school, and he has yet to have a family of his own. He is dating a girl named Mia, who is best described as a "LA party girl" but he does not approve of her personality. He shows up for the reunion with the gang, and upon seeing Jim again, he acknowledges he may have missed his wedding but he'd never miss the reunion (alluding to his absence in the previous film). In the meantime, he tries to rekindle his relationship with Heather, who is dating an arrogant heart surgeon name Ron(who some people call Dr. Ron or "Dron").   After Ron embarrasses him by showing the video of him losing to Gilbert Gottfried to everyone during Stifler's party, he eventually tells Heather how he still feels about her and they share a kiss. They officially got back to together at their high school reunion.

Victoria Vicky Lathum

 Portrayed by Tara Reid
 Appeared in: American Pie, American Pie 2, and American Reunion
Vicky first appears in American Pie, where she is Kevin Myers's girlfriend. At the end of American Pie, Vicky breaks up with Kevin after having sex with him at Stifler's lake-house party after the prom.

In American Pie 2, she appears to have moved on from Kevin; she tells Stifler and Oz and Kevin while they're playing pool, that she had sex with only one guy, which upsets Kevin, and before the last scene, Kevin admits to her that he hadn't moved on, and they agreed to be friends, then she dances with him at their lake party.

In American Reunion, she appears to have broken up with her boyfriend and is staying with her parents while in town for the reunion. She gets mad at Kevin for thinking they had sex after waking up in the bed with her and his clothes are off. In the last scene Kevin confesses his old feelings for her, and explains that he loves his wife but that she will always be his first love. He then introduces Vicky to his wife at the reunion, where his wife insists that the three of them share a dance.

Heather

 Portrayed by Mena Suvari
 Appeared in: American Pie, American Pie 2, and American Reunion
Heather first appears in American Pie where she starts a relationship with Oz after he joins her choir group and initially turns Oz down, until he proves that he really likes Heather.

Heather reappears in American Pie 2 where she is out of town and has phone sex with Oz until a foreigner and Stifler interrupt. She later surprises Oz at the party.

While absent from American Wedding, she appears in American Reunion where she has a slightly bigger role. She has broken up with Oz and dates a heart surgeon named Ron, who turns out to be a jerk, and they separate as Heather goes back to Oz.

Jessica
 Portrayed by Natasha Lyonne
 Appeared in: American Pie, American Pie 2, and American Reunion
Jessica is a friend of Vicky, Finch and Kevin, and usually gives them advice on what some high school "codes" mean such as for example, she tells Vicky that when a man says they slept with two or more girls she says it means they slept with one or none in reality, humorously Stifler says the opposite to his friends in that he says that it equals more, not less. In American Pie 2, at the lake house party, she and Stifler briefly entertain the thought that their animosity might be due to sexual tension which they immediately scoff at and laugh off. Jessica has a brief cameo at the end of American Reunion in which she has come out as a lesbian and tells Kevin to talk to Vicky. A rather lengthy deleted scene shows Jessica and Finch catching up, with Jessica also giving him some pointers on sex with Selena.

Nadia

 Portrayed by Shannon Elizabeth
 Appeared in: American Pie, American Pie 2, and American Reunion
Nadia is a Czech exchange student in American Pie to whom Jim attempted to lose his virginity. Stifler persuades Jim to set up a webcam in his room so that they can all watch Jim with Nadia. The plan at first seems to suffer a hiccup, however, when Nadia discovers Jim's pornography collection and sits half-naked on his bed to read it, but this makes her stay. Jim is persuaded to return to his room, where he joins Nadia, unaware that he accidentally sent the weblink to the entire school directory. Nadia (thanks to her fetish for geeks) tells Jim to strip slowly for her after he sees her naked. When he does so, this manages to turn her on, giving Jim the chance to be deflowered. As Nadia is preparing to have sex with him, he prematurely ejaculates not once but twice, humiliating himself live in front of the entire school. Shortly afterwards, Nadia is forced to leave school and go back home after her exchange family sees the video, leaving Jim completely dateless for prom, and the likelihood of him losing his virginity before the end of high school is gone.

Nadia makes her second appearance in American Pie 2. Traveling across the US, Nadia agrees to join Jim at his beach party. When Nadia turns up earlier than expected, Michelle acts as his fake girlfriend so that he won't have to have sex with Nadia until his penis has healed. At the party, Jim realizes that it isn't Nadia he wants, but Michelle. Nadia is disappointed that Jim chose a geek over her, but is happy for Jim and allows him to go and find Michelle, performing at band camp. Meanwhile, the geeky Sherman mulls around at the party in a depressed mood, having abandoned his "Sherminator" mantra from the first film due to his abject failure with girls. By chance, he begins talking to the rejected Nadia, who is also depressed, and the two hit it off almost instantly. Nadia encourages Sherman to become the Sherminator once more, displaying a desire/fetish for geeks, and excitedly drags him into an upstairs bedroom where Sherman finally loses his virginity, to the shock of Stifler.

Although she does not appear in American Wedding, Jim has doubts about if he made the right decision in choosing Michelle over Nadia, after Stifler says that it was the biggest mistake Jim has ever made. This prompts Jim to have a chat with his father, Noah, who apparently has a minor attraction to Nadia. Noah at first tries to brush off the idea of being with Nadia, but after Jim asks if he would sleep with her if he was her age and not married, Noah immediately answers "In a heartbeat". She is not mentioned again for the remainder of the film.

Nadia is mentioned briefly in The Book of Love, since her cousin is currently attending East Great Falls High.

In American Reunion, Nadia briefly sees Jim and Michelle at the high school reunion, walking in on them having sex while showing off her boyfriend, who bears a striking resemblance to Jim.

Chuck Sherman

 Portrayed by Chris Owen
 Appeared in: American Pie, American Pie 2, American Pie Presents Band Camp, and American Reunion
Chuck "The Sherminator" Sherman first appears in American Pie, when he claims to have lost his virginity at a party hosted by classmate Steve Stifler. At the prom, everything seems hopeless for the four boys until Vicky asks the girl that Chuck Sherman claimed to have bedded about her "first time". She proclaims to everyone at the prom that she and Sherman did not have sex at Stifler's party, leaving Sherman embarrassed and making him wet himself.

He reappears in the second film where he goes to the party hosted by Jim and his friends. Later he mulls around at the party in a depressed mood, having abandoned his "Sherminator" mantra from the first film due to his abject failure with girls. By chance, he begins talking to the rejected Nadia, who is also depressed, and the two hit it off almost instantly. Nadia encourages Sherman to become the Sherminator once more, displaying a desire/fetish for geeks, and excitedly drags him into an upstairs bedroom where Sherman finally loses his virginity, to the shock of Stifler.

He reappears in American Pie Presents: Band Camp when Matt Stifler plays a prank on the school band. Sherman, who is now the school's guidance counselor, decides that a worthwhile punishment would be for Stifler to attend band camp.

He has appeared at the East Great Falls High reunion in American Reunion. He told Stifler he got married, had a son named Furlong and later divorced. He moves on quickly when he sees the most popular girl in high school everyone had a crush on (who has since put on considerable weight), and picks her up using his Sherminator persona.

Matt Stifler
 Portrayed by Eli Marienthal in American Pie and American Pie 2, and Tad Hilgenbrink in American Pie Presents Band Camp
 Appeared in: American Pie, American Pie 2 and American Pie Presents Band Camp
Matt Stifler is a fictional character from the American Pie series of teen comedy films. He is the younger brother of Steve Stifler and second son of Janine Stifler. His first name was not revealed until his appearance in the first spin-off Band Camp. He was featured in the first two installments in the theatrical series and then given his own straight-to-DVD spin-off, American Pie Presents: Band Camp.

Matt was first introduced to the series alongside his elder brother watching Nadia, the foreign exchange student, strip-tease in Jim Levenstein's bed room. And then lastly when Vicky opened the closet and Matt comes out. His next appearance was in American Pie 2, where he requested to stay along with his brother in their summer beach house. In this film, set a year after the first, Matt begun to show his interest in girls and even at his young age showed signs of the infamous Stifler Sex Drive. Although Steve teaches him several lessons on how to get girls, when it comes to the night of the party he simply puts Matt on watch-dog duty. Angered, Matt waits outside and begins to aimlessly work his walkie-talkie. Much to his surprise and pleasure, however, he accidentally comes across the signal of the girls across the street. After being asked who's speaking, an eager-to-impress Matt states they are in fact talking to "the Stiffmeister". He manages to impress the girls enough to meet up with him but his prize is cut short when his brother intervenes successfully wooing the girls into bed with him. Matt leaves the next day, his hands full of porn videos, bidding goodbye to Steve and his friends.

Matt's next appearance was as a starring role in Band Camp, which sees him eager to join the family business of making amateur porn films. On the day of the seniors graduation, he and his friends spray the band instruments with pepper spray. The prank, however, is cut short after Matt accidentally left the pepper spray open and leaking in his pocket evidently burning his penis. The band, unable to see due to the spray, accidentally destroy the set inadvertently revealing Matt as the culprit. As punishment, he must endure his summer at Band Camp. Now classed by his old friends as a bandee, Matt tries to prove himself by filming his fellow band members sexual activities throughout the summer. However, as the summer progresses, Matt suddenly develops a friendship with his fellow campers and romantic feelings for the drum major Elyse, whom he had recently had an off screen relationship with prior. With the help of Mr Levenstein, Matt realizes that living in his brother's shadow and following in his footsteps isn't what he should be doing. By the end of the film, Matt reforms himself much like his older brother did in American Wedding. However, he is still content on insulting his peers and still has an active sex drive but appears far less selfish, nasty and bullying.

Matt's next appearance is a simple cameo in the second spin-off Naked Mile, where he is introduced as a picture on his younger cousin, Erik's, wall as a "legendary Stifler Boy", implying that whilst he learnt his lesson in Band Camp, he still acts with Stifler traits. He is mentioned again later by Mr. Levenstein after Erik asks if he could ask for some advice.

He has another cameo in Book of Love as a name written on the rent card of "The Bible" (The School's Sex Manual), implying that he must have rented it out at some point during his school years.

Evidently, Matt looks up to his older brother as a role model, and initially hopes to be just like him. However, after the events of Band Camp, he realizes that this future isn't as good as it previously seemed. Matt is notable to be possibly the only member of the Stifler family, aside from his older brother in American Wedding, to realize that the "Stifler Legacy" isn't necessarily a good one. He is also different from other Stiflers as Mr. Levenstein notes that people actually want to like him but they find it difficult due to the way he acts.

John and Justin

 Portrayed by John Cho and Justin Isfield
 Appeared in: American Pie, American Pie 2, American Wedding, and American Reunion
The two are often referred to as the "MILF Guys" and are named after their portrayers, though John is the only one to have been referred to by name, which occurred in American Wedding. The two first appear in American Pie, where they are seen at Stifler's Party. Here they are seen chanting "MILF" at a picture of Stifler's Mom. John also is a choir member. Though their role was brief and minor, their appearance in the film has been significant as the term "MILF" has since become popular due to the usage in the film by John and Justin. They are also friends with the core four Kevin, Jim, Oz and Finch.

Their next appearance is in American Pie 2 in a slightly larger role. They are first seen at Stifler's party, once again. They are waiting to get into the bathroom, when they come across Paul Finch, who slept with Stifler's Mom in the first film. John and Justin admire Finch and ask him how he did it. They are next seen when John, in a memorable scene, urinates off of a balcony and onto Stifler's head, unintentionally. Justin covers his back as he does so. The two walk off and are not seen again until the climatic party scene at the beach house. They are seen getting drunk and partying with various women. The last we see of them is the two of them walking off on the beach, with John saying "Am I gonna have a hangover? 'Cause I want one."

They reappear in American Wedding, where John's name is revealed for the first time. The two serve as two ushers at Jim and Michelle's wedding. They are tasked with looking after Jim's grandma, but end up putting her inside a broom closet instead. John and Justin are last scene outside of Stifler's Mom's room window, peering in to see her taking a bath, where they see Paul Finch emerge from the water, performing cunnilingus on her. They once again chant "MILF", before the window steams up and obscures their view as Finch goes back under the water.

Their last appearance is in American Reunion. John has a much bigger role in this, and his character is expanded upon, while Justin only makes a brief cameo. John and Justin's names are never mentioned as they are credited as simply "MILF Guy #2" and "MILF Guy #1", respectively. John is first seen pulling up alongside Jim's car, as he has just crashed. He is panicking and asking if he is okay, until he realizes it is Jim. The two become reacquainted and talk to each other. John reveals he is organizing the reunion. He also mentions that he and his "MILF" buddy Justin are not on good terms right now, and would rather not speak of him. He sees Kara get out from Jim's lap, and, thinking it's Michelle, assumes she is performing fellatio on him. John laughs and gives a thumbs up to Jim before driving off. He is again seen at Stifler's party, where he almost blows Jim's cover by saying he saw Jim and Michelle last night, but then walks off before he can elaborate on it. He later watches Oz compete on the Celebrity Dance-Off video. He helps in the fight by throwing a weapon to Finch. When the cops arrive, John runs out of the house. At the reunion, John hands out name tags to all the class of '99. He is last seen in the bleachers, watching Stifler and Finch's Mom having sexual intercourse. He is drinking heavily and is depressed, due to Justin's absence. He hears "MILF" uttered to the side of him, and turns to see Justin. The two repeatedly say "MILF" softly to each other leading into their chant "MILF! MILF!" and then hug; the two continue to watch Stifler and Finch's Mom have sex as they gleefully chant.

Despite his effeminate behavior, according to the directors' commentary on American Reunion, John is a heterosexual.

Jeanine Stifler
 Portrayed by Jennifer Coolidge
 Appeared in: American Pie, American Pie 2, American Wedding, and American Reunion

Although the role of Jeanine is very limited, the character becomes important mostly at the end of the movies. While her first name is revealed in the second film, she is more frequently referred to as Stifler's Mom by the majority of the characters in the films.

Jeanine Stifler is the divorced mother of Steve and Matt Stifler. When Jim and his friends are at Stifler's house they see a picture of her. They are impressed and all want to have sex with her. Jeanine turns up at the end of the movie. She meets Paul Finch while he is exploring the house and enters the billiard room where she is sitting. Jeanine tries to seduce Paul (although the opposite is also true) and they have sex on the billiard table. They are caught by Steven.

In American Pie 2 there are many references to this incident. Jeanine is expected to be at the beach house where Jim, Paul, Steven and the others stay during their vacation. Paul, still in love with Jeanine, learned to control his sexual drifts via meditation and hopes to have sex with her once again. Stifler is certain this will not happen again. Just before the boys head home, a car turns up driven by Jeanine. She asks Paul if she can drive him home, to which he agrees. Stifler, who is still in the house, is told a lost tourist was asking the way and Paul decided to travel home on his own. However, Stifler is suspicious about the guys claims, demanding them to tell him who is that tourist in the car. In the next scene, Jeanine and Paul have sex in the car.

In American Wedding, Paul tells Steven he had sex twice with Jeanine, further fueling his anger. Once again, Jeanine turns up at the end of the movie. She tells Paul not to be interested in her anymore, to which he agrees. However, it is now revealed they had sex more than twice. They get excited and leave. In next scene, they have sex while taking a bath.

In American Reunion, Jeanine appears in a bigger role. She has grown tired of being looked upon as a sexual object and breaks up with a loser boyfriend. She later meets Jim's father Noah Levenstein, who is now a widower. Jeanine is smitten with Noah and they talk about their son's embarrassing moments in puberty while sharing a laugh. The two start a relationship by going to a movie, where she is touched at him for being a gentleman by treating her more like a woman.

Characters from American Pie 2

Amber and Danielle
 Portrayed by Lisa Arturo and Denise Faye
 Appeared in: American Pie 2
Amber and Danielle are fictional characters from the American Pie series of teen comedy films. They first appear when Kevin finds work for himself and his friends as painters and decorators for a house nearby. Stifler is intrigued by the Amber and Danielle the owners, who appear to be lesbians, and excitedly breaks into their house while they're away. Jim and Finch follow him, trying to get him out, but they are caught by Amber and Danielle, who relent on calling the police. But after Stifler identifies his interest in their homosexuality, they insist on the boys performing "like for like" homosexual acts on each other in return for being able to watch the girls do the same thing. The boys soon leave after they request the boys to go further than they are prepared. Stifler later goes on to have a threesome with them, when they turn out to be bisexual and are found by Matt on the walkie talkies.

Characters from American Wedding

Cadence Flaherty

 Portrayed by January Jones
 Appeared in: American Wedding
Cadence Flaherty is a fictional character from the American Pie series of teen comedy films. She appears in American Wedding as Michelle's sister who is attending her wedding, and Finch is quickly attracted to her. Stifler also becomes attracted to her. Upon hearing that Cadence is hoping to attract a decent guy, Stifler adopts a more meek attitude and acts like Finch, and avoids swearing and speaks of philosophy. But when Finch realizes that Cadence is beginning to tire of the intellectual Stifler, Finch acts immature, rude, and perverted: in other words, like Stifler. Cadence begins to catch on that her two suitors are acting like each other, so the question of who she will choose becomes more complicated. Stifler unintentionally kills the flowers the night before the wedding, and actually feels bad about it, prompting him to bring in the football team he coaches to set up the entire room with new flowers. Cadence chooses Stifler, and Finch admits that Stifler was probably better for her anyway. They broke at the end of American Wedding and she never lost her virginity. By the events of American Reunion, Cadence and Stifler have broken up, and she is never mentioned. Her picture appears in the flashback montage during the end credits.

Bear
 Portrayed by Eric Allan Kramer
 Appeared in: American Wedding

Bear (aka Mr. Belvedere) is a fictional character from the American Pie series of teen comedy films. He appears in American Wedding as Stifler's new buddy. He is a burly homosexual man who is a regular at a gay bar the boys unwittingly visit, to find a fashion designer named Leslie Sommers to make Michelle's wedding dress. Initially, he is offended by Stifler's rude remarks and behavior, but after the two engage in a dance-off, Stifler wins over Bear and the other patrons, and the two become instant friends. He gladly provides strippers for the bachelor party and even parties with them. However, when Jim and the Flahertys return and interrupt the party, Bear helps the boys pretend nothing is going on by posing as an English butler named "Mr. Belvedere". He later attends the wedding, and dances with his date during the reception. He does not reappear in American Reunion.

Grandma Levenstein
 Portrayed by Angela Paton
 Appeared in: American Wedding
Grandma Levenstein is a fictional character from the American Pie series of teen comedy films. She appears in American Wedding and is introduced to be Jim's grandmother and Noah's mother. In the deleted scenes it is revealed that She does not have much longer to live so the wedding is moved up so She can attend. She voices her disapproval towards Michelle for not being Jewish. Jim, Kevin and Finch recruits John and Justin to keep an eye on her. However, they put Grandma Levenstein in the closet due to her constant complaining in her disapproval against Jim and Michelle's wedding. Stifler walked inside the closet and believed her to be Cadence that he has sex with her. Only when Kevin and Finch open the closet, he is horrified that he had sex with Jim's grandmother, who tells him to focus more. After this, she acts more friendly and kind, especially to Stifler who is still horrified by the whole thing.

Characters from American Reunion

Past cast members including Jason Biggs, Seann William Scott, Eugene Levy, Alyson Hannigan, Chris Klein, Mena Suvari, Thomas Ian Nicholas, Tara Reid, Natasha Lyonne, Eddie Kaye Thomas, Shannon Elizabeth, Chris Owen, Jennifer Coolidge, and John Cho all appear in the film as their respective characters.

Evan Levenstein 
 Portrayed by George Christopher Bianchi
 Appeared in: American Reunion
Evan Levenstein is Jim's and Michelle's two-year-old son, and the grandson of Noah Levenstein and the late Mrs. Levenstein.

Kara
 Portrayed by Ali Cobrin
 Appeared in: American Reunion
Kara is a high school senior whom Jim used to babysit. Having just turned 18, she tries to lose her virginity to him, while she is drunk from a high school party, but ends up passing out in his car after she has taken her clothes off. Jim then has to return her to her parents' house without her parents seeing them.

AJ
 Portrayed by Chuck Hittinger
 Appeared in: American Reunion
AJ is a high school senior who is Kara's boyfriend, who's sexually frustrated and is ready to have sex with Kara, who's holding out until the "right time". He is arrogant, selfish, hostile, and extremely paranoid, thinking Jim is trying to steal Kara from him. He is similar to Steve Stifler in the American Pie series. Throughout the film, he harasses the gang (especially Jim and Stifler), which ultimately leads to a big fight between the teens (AJ and his crew), and the '99 gang (consisting of Jim, Oz, Finch, Stifler, Kevin, John, and Michelle). He serves as the main antagonist out of the three villains.

Dr. Ron
 Portrayed by Jay Harrington
 Appeared in: American Reunion

Ron is Heather's new boyfriend. He takes great joy in both embarrassing and patronizing Oz, such as providing the DVD to his appearance on Celebrity Dance-Off in order to not only humiliate him but to make him look bad in front of Heather. When he catches Oz kissing Heather, he dares him to punch him so he can sue him, but Stifler intervenes and punches him because if he sues him and not Oz, he'll get nothing because he isn't worth anything.

Mia

 Portrayed by Katrina Bowden
 Appeared in: American Reunion
Mia is Oz's much younger supermodel girlfriend from Los Angeles, and one of the three antagonists of the film. She accompanies her boyfriend to his high school reunion, where Oz eventually re-connects with his ex-girlfriend Heather. Throughout the movie, she is implied to be very wild and sexually promiscuous, such as when she admits to having been in an orgy and cheating on Oz with Mario Lopez.

Selena Vega
 Portrayed by Dania Ramirez
 Appeared in: American Reunion

Selena is Finch's girlfriend and Michelle's best friend from band. As a teenager, she had pimples and was obese. As an adult, she works as a bartender at a local pub. Upon meeting her, Finch immediately recognizes her, and the two soon hit it off, and begin dating. She falls in love with Finch, not because of his "interesting" lifestyle but because he was the only person that was nice to her during their high school days. She's shown to have the same hyperactive sex drive as Michelle. In the end, Finch and Selena plan to a vacation to Europe, implying that the couple will have a future together.

Madison and Alexa
 Portrayed by Jennifer Bell (Madison) and Autumn Dial (Alexa)
 Appeared in: American Reunion

Madison and Alexa are Kara's best friends. They are first seen at her party where Stifler tries to impress them by saying he likes Twilight.
When Stifler takes a call on his phone the two ditch him.

Characters from American Pie Presents: Band Camp

Elyse Houston

 Portrayed by Arielle Kebbel
 Appeared in: American Pie Presents: Band Camp
Elyse Houston is a fictional character from the American Pie series of teen comedy films. She appears in Band Camp as a love interest for Matt Stifler. When the school bands compete for points throughout camp, with East Great Falls leading on the last day until a prank by Stifler in which he was originally supposed to sabotage the other band so as to help Elyse, causes the band to lose and Elyse to lose a chance at a scholarship. Once the new term starts Matt attempts to fix his mistakes and persuades the school band to play Elyse's piece to the Conservatory head to impress the board which wins Elyse a scholarship, and Matt her affection.

Dialogue between Matt and Elyse suggest they were previously friends. This ended, however, after Elyse became tired with his frequent pranks and putdowns toward her for the appeasement of his brother. Despite this, they reconcile toward the end of the movie.

Brandon Vandecamp
 Portrayed by Matt Barr
 Appeared in: American Pie Presents: Band Camp

Brandon Vandecamp is a fictional character from the American Pie series of teen comedy films. He is the antagonist of Band camp as well as the camp's school council leader. He immediately takes a dislike to Matt and the two later have a musical duel as to which he wins. Brandon wins a scholarship when his band wins the competition for points but he is later disqualified and Elyse gets it.

Ernie Kaplowitz

 Portrayed by Jason Earles
 Appeared in: American Pie Presents: Band Camp
Ernie Kalpowitz is a fictional character from the American Pie series of teen comedy films. He is the geeky roommate and later friend of Matt. He conspires with Matt to film other band members in a Girls Gone Wild style video, using hidden cameras although he believes it is only for their viewing pleasure. He tries to impress his love interest, Chloe by bringing her a drink with his robot at which he succeeds, eventually earning her affections. He nearly blows his chances when she realizes Matt and Ernie have been filming her, along with many other girls. In the end, they resume their relationship, and during the credits, Ernie is seen playing an oboe up Chloe's vagina, as she lies down and enjoys it.

James Jimmy Chong
 Portrayed by Jun Hee Lee
 Appeared in: American Pie Presents: Band Camp
James "Jimmy" Chong is a fictional character from the American Pie series of teen comedy films. He appears as a supporting character and as the comic relief of the film. He relays events of inserting his penis into an oboe which he gives Stifler the idea. When Stifler tries it out he is heading to the instrument room he finds Matt with his penis stuck inside an oboe where he reveals he was joking.

He, along with his other fellow bandees turned against Matt after it was revealed he was secretly filming their raunchy misadventures to screen in front of the school at the start of the next semester. However, after Stifler redeemed himself he can be seen hanging around him leaving the presumption that they soon became friends after.

Characters from American Pie Presents: The Naked Mile

Erik Stifler
 Portrayed by John White
 Appeared in: American Pie Presents: The Naked Mile and American Pie Presents: Beta House
Erik Stifler is a fictional character from the American Pie series of teen comedy films. He is introduced in the second spin-off Naked Mile as Steve and Matt's younger cousin and son to Harry Stifler and his wife. Whilst they share the same name-sake, Erik is different from other Stiflers in that he does not possess the same sexual prowess, use of swearing and anti-social behavior. He does prove to be easily manipulated, often giving into peer pressure and eager to live up to the Stifler legacy. He is the nice guy of the Stifler family.

In Naked Mile, Erik is ready to graduate high school. However, he is currently about to be the only one in his family to graduate a virgin. Deciding that he is clearly ready when she is not, Erik's girlfriend permits him a "hall pass" giving him the opportunity to do anything over the weekend without consequences. Ready to lose his virginity, he organizes a road trip with his two best friends Mike and Ryan to meet up with his elder cousin Dwight in college during The Naked Mile. Whilst he is presented with several opportunities to have sex, Erik decides he only truly wants to lose it with Tracy, his girlfriend, causing him to ride a horse back to her house and inform her that he doesn't care what happens as long as he's with her. They then reconcile and make love.

Erik returns in American Pie Presents: Beta House as he readies himself for his arrival at college. Tracy dumps Erik off-screen leaving him open for a relationship. Although he performed poorly at the opening party, his namesake causes him to become accepted in the Beta Fraternity due to Dwight's reasoning. The rest of the film then follows him, Mike Coozeman and his newly found friends and the tasks they perform to get into the frat. Erik also meets a girl called Ashley and begins dating her.

After they complete their final task to get into fraternity, which involves stealing something from the GEEK house, Edgar, the GEEK's president, challenges the BETAs to the Greek Olympiad. The loser will give up their charter and be evicted from their house. They win the tournament leaving Beta House a permanent fixture in the college.

Dwight Stifler
 Portrayed by Steve Talley
 Appeared in: American Pie Presents: The Naked Mile and American Pie Presents: Beta House
Dwight Stifler is a fictional character from the American Pie series of teen comedy films and the cousin of Steve, Matt, Erik and Scott. Although he shares the trademark Stifler sex drive, Dwight is shown to be a little less critical of his peers, though more so to his enemies.

He first appears in Naked Mile, introduced by his younger cousin Erik as a "legendary Stifler boy" alongside his other cousins Matt and Steve.

Ryan Grimm
 Portrayed by Ross Thomas
 Appeared in: American Pie Presents: The Naked Mile
Ryan Grimm is a fictional character from the American Pie series of teen comedy films. Ryan and his friends, Erik and Cooze, plan a road trip to visit Erik's cousin Dwight Stifler in Michigan during an event known as the Naked Mile. They later arrive on campus. Ryan does not appear in the sequel to the Naked Mile due to the character attending college in California.

Mike Cooze Coozeman
 Portrayed by Jake Siegel
 Appeared in: American Pie Presents: The Naked Mile and American Pie Presents: Beta House
Mike "Cooze" Coozeman is a fictional character from the American Pie series of teen comedy films. Cooze and his friends, Erik and Ryan, plan a road trip to visit Erik's cousin Dwight Stifler in Michigan during an event known as the Naked Mile. They later arrive on campus. In the sequel they arrive at college, where he learns that he and Erik will be rooming separately. After they complete their final task, which involves stealing something from the GEEK house, Edgar, the GEEK's president, challenges the BETAs to the Greek Olympiad. The loser will give up their charter and be evicted from their house and the BETAs win. The BETAs move into their new mansion, courtesy of the GEEKs, and hold a massive toga party, where Cooze, much to his relief, finally sleeps with Denise and all suspicions of her being a man are gone. She simply has the rare female ability to ejaculate.

Tracy Sterling
 Portrayed by Jessy Schram
 Appeared in: American Pie Presents: The Naked Mile
Tracy Sterling is a fictional character from the American Pie series of teen comedy films. She appears as Erik's girlfriend of two years, and tells him she loves him, but is not ready for intercourse. Tracy decides to have sex, their first attempt goes horribly wrong, and she backs out of trying again. Erik plans a road trip to visit Erik's cousin Dwight Stifler in Michigan during an event known as the Naked Mile. Tracy sees this as an opportunity to give Erik a "guilt free weekend pass", hoping that he can quench his lust and get sex out of his system since she is not ready. Erik meets a college girl with a fetish for virgin boys and as they steal a kiss, a news crew captures the moment. Watching the news report about the Naked Mile back at home, Tracy is upset and feels guilty that she allowed Erik the free pass. Her friends convince her to also lose her virginity before he gets back. Later that evening Erik realizes that he loves Tracy and rushes back to see his girlfriend. When he gets to her house, Tracy's dad says she is at a party and Erik arrives at the party just as Tracy has headed upstairs, presumably to lose her virginity to her ex-boyfriend. Erik loudly pounds on the closed bedroom door, proclaiming his love for her. However, Tracy was not in the room because she had decided that she could not go through with her plans. Later that evening, Tracy and Erik decide that they should be each other's first. They make love that night. When Erik returns to the college to pick up his friends the next morning, each boy shares stories of his experiences from the night before. The three friends drive back to East Great Falls. She does not appear in the sequel because she is no longer with Erik, as she has left him for her ex-boyfriend Trent.

Rock
 Portrayed by Jordan Prentice
 Appeared in: American Pie Presents: The Naked Mile and American Pie Presents: Beta House
Rock is a fictional character from the American Pie series of teen comedy films. Dwight and Rock's fraternity have several clashes including an over-the-top drinking contest, a rough game of football and a brawl. This rivalry comes to a head when the midget fraternity attacks Dwight, landing him in the hospital. During the post-Naked Mile party, Dwight spots Vicky, the girlfriend of Rock, and both have sex. Later, Dwight sends a DVD to Rock that reads, "Payback's a bitch." It reveals both Dwight and Vicky having sex, as Rock yells out, "Stifler!" In the sequel Rock reveals that due to an altercation between Edgar and a sheep, Rock's entire fraternity was kicked off campus. Dwight is hesitant, but Rock states that what they had was a rivalry and that "the enemy of my enemy is my friend." This advice helps the BETAs win the GEEKs in the olympiad.

Harry Stifler

 Portrayed by Christopher McDonald
 Appeared in: American Pie Presents: The Naked Mile and American Pie Presents: Beta House
Harry Stifler is a fictional character from the American Pie series of teen comedy films. He is Erik's father and is married, but was temporarily separated from his wife while Erik was three (during those two weeks, he slept with ten women, including the mother of Erik's friend, Cooze). He frequently complains about his son not living up to the Stifler name with statements such as "Stiflers don't fake sick to pull dick, they cut class to get ass." Erik responds with "I know, that saying is on our family crest." He proves to be a hypocrite, though, when he is seen pleasuring himself with the same dumpster porn that Erik was watching.

Bull
 Portrayed by Dan Petronijevic
 Appeared in: American Pie Presents: The Naked Mile and American Pie Presents: Beta House
Bull is a fictional character from the American Pie series of teen comedy films. He is a friend of Dwight and appears in the sequel.

Jill
 Portrayed by Jaclyn A. Smith
 Appeared in: American Pie Presents: The Naked Mile and American Pie Presents: Beta House
Jill is a fictional character from the American Pie series of teen comedy films. She is part of a sorority and Cooze later falls for her. She returns to her part in the sequel.

Characters from American Pie Presents: Beta House

Ashley Thomas

 Portrayed by Meghan Heffern
 Appeared in: American Pie Presents: Beta House
Ashley Thomas is a fictional character from the American Pie series of teen comedy films. She is the love interest of Erik throughout Beta House after they meet in the bathroom where things go well until Erik urinates on his pants. She gets together with Erik after he splits with long-term girlfriend Tracy off screen.

Edgar Willis
 Portrayed by Tyrone Savage
 Appeared in: American Pie Presents: Beta House
Edgar Willis is a fictional character from the American Pie series of teen comedy films. Edgar is the GEEK's president and challenges the BETAs to the Greek Olympiad. The loser will give up their charter and be evicted from their house. It is revealed by Rock, Dwight's former nemesis, that due to an altercation between Edgar and a sheep, Rock's entire fraternity was kicked off campus. The first competition is won by Beta House as Dwight and Edgar compete by removing girls' bras. Beta House loses next two competitions: a light saber duel and catching a greased pig. When the BETAs and GEEKs reach the final challenge, they use Edgar's wool fetish against him, which ultimately costs him and his house the tournament. As the film ends Edgar is seen hanging out at the Silver Dollar, sniffing the headpiece of the sheep costume. He gives it to a passing stripper, instructing her to use it for her next dance.

Bobby
 Portrayed by Nick Nicotera
 Appeared in: American Pie Presents: Beta House
Bobby is a fictional character from the American Pie series of teen comedy films. He is Erik's roommate who, along with him and Cooze, pledging the Beta House and trying to complete list of tasks on the Beta House pledge board.

Denise
 Portrayed by Sarah Power
 Appeared in: American Pie Presents: Beta House
Denise is a fictional character from the American Pie series of teen comedy films. She is the love interest of Erik's best friend Cooze, and the roommate of Erik's love interest Ashley.

Characters from American Pie Presents: The Book of Love

Rob Shearson
 Portrayed by Bug Hall
 Appeared in: American Pie Presents: The Book of Love
Rob Shearson is a fictional character from the American Pie series of teen comedy films. Rob is introduced as the virgin friend of Nathan and Lube who are labeled as outsiders and geeks. The story begins with Rob entering his bedroom, and attempting to masturbate with a peanut butter and jelly sandwich. While he is doing this his dog, tries to eat the sandwich, and Rob's little brother Cody takes a video of him receiving this unwanted sexual gratification. Later, Rob meets with his friends, Nathan and Marshall Lube, at school. Rob talks to Heidi, a girl he is attracted to, and Stifler. Stifler states that if Rob doesn't make a move on Heidi, he will. Rob and Heidi meet later in the school library where she discloses that she is a virgin, and wishes to just "get it [sex] over with". At the school dance, Nathan tries to get to second base with Dana, but only manages to offend her due to her abstinance pledge. Rob attempts to tell Heidi how he feels about her but is interrupted by Nathan and Lube. He eventually finds her in the library about to have sex with another student, and drops a lit candle in a bin in shock. This sets the library on fire, which sets off the water sprinklers. The next day, when Rob and Heidi are cleaning the library, Rob finds a secret compartment containing "The Bible". He shows the book to his friends Nathan and Lube and explains that it is a sex manual that has been compiled over 40 years by the students who found it. The book is regarded as legendary, but unfortunately has been damaged by the water. Later in the local mall, Rob attempts to test a tip in the book, "Simple Flattery". He approaches Ashley in a lingerie store and compliments her. Ashley leads him into a changing room, takes off her bra and top, and makes him steal a bra for her. Unfortunately Rob is caught and forced to pay for the bra with his mom's credit card. When she receives her credit card bill, Rob's mom tries to talk to him about buying underwear, prompting Rob to sarcastically say that he likes wearing women's underwear. He is again filmed by his little brother, who again posts the footage on the internet for the whole school to see. The next day, Heidi, Imogen and Dana are spectating at a school basketball game in which Rob and Stifler are playing in which they help the team win by going to the playoffs. Rob again attempts to tell Heidi how he feels, but is unable to. Lube discovers a page in The Bible which tells of a brothel in Canada and a prostitute, Monique, who is very experienced. The entry was written in 1975, but Lube misreads the date as 1995, and they decide to visit. When they meet Monique the boys are disgusted, but Nathan states that they should go for it anyway. Nathan and Lube make Rob go first, but Monique dies while performing oral sex on him. They panic and drive back to the USA. Rob and Heidi are once again in the library where Rob finally tells her he is attracted to her. Heidi says she feels the same, and they agree to meet at Stifler's party later. At the party Heidi hears Rob shout "Tonight, I'm getting laid!", and runs upstairs. Stifler again brushes off Katie when she tries to talk to him. Heidi follows him downstairs, but Rob refuses to talk to her and begins to drink heavily. He declares to Lube and Nathan that "assholes get laid!", which gets some cheers from other boys. Then he behaves crudely to a random girl, who promptly goes to bed with him. She asks him to have sex with her from behind, but he hallucinates and sees Heidi saying; "You aren't seriously going to stick your dick in that, are you?" Rob then throws up on the girl's back. The next morning his mother asks him if he drove home drunk, and shows him a film she received on her phone of Rob throwing up on the girl the night before. Rob and his friends resolve to find all of the people who originally wrote it in order to recreate it, starting with the original creator, Noah Levenstein. They eventually succeed in recreating the book. Rob and his friends then go on the school ski trip. Heidi and Rob are riding up the mountain in separate gondola ski lifts, but Nathan has sex with Dana in the lift control room and accidentally shut off the lifts' power. In one lift, Rob and Heidi reconcile and kiss. Heidi and Rob return to the cabin and have sex.

The story ends with Rob, Nathan and Lube returning the newly restored Bible to where Rob found it, after Rob has added his signature to it. As a finale, Rob's brother, Cody, enters his bedroom to find an online film of him putting a vacuum cleaner on his penis. To his horror it has been viewed almost 10 million times. Rob ends the film with the words "Gotchaaaaa, ha ha."

Scott Stifler
 Portrayed by John Patrick Jordan
 Appeared in: American Pie Presents: The Book of Love
Scott Stifler is a fictional character from the American Pie series of teen comedy films. His obnoxious behavior, everlasting sex drive, and frequent insults are more in common with his elder cousins Steve and Dwight than Erik and Matt. Taking the helm from Steve, Scott hosts some of the most infamous and raunchy parties the students at East Great Falls have to offer.

Nathan Jenkyll
 Portrayed by Kevin M. Horton
 Appeared in: American Pie Presents: The Book of Love
Nathan Jenkyll is a fictional character from the American Pie series of teen comedy films. Nathan reveals that his girlfriend, Dana, has pledged to abstain from sex until marriage despite the fact that she has already slept with six other people. At the school dance, Nathan tries to get to second base with Dana, but only manages to offend her due to her abstinance pledge. Nathan goes to Dana's church service to talk to her, but accidentally broadcasts the explicit and highly personal conversation to the entire congregation on the church's PA system. Dana's father then bans Dana from seeing Nathan. Nathan attempts to reconcile with Dana but offends her, making her leave once again. The next day, when Rob and Heidi are cleaning the library, Rob finds a secret compartment containing "The Bible". He shows the book to his friends Nathan and Lube and explains that it is a sex manual that has been compiled over 40 years by the students who found it. Lube discovers a page in The Bible which tells of a brothel in Canada and a prostitute, Monique, who is very experienced. The entry was written in 1975, but Lube misreads the date as 1995, and they decide to visit. When they meet Monique the boys are disgusted, but Nathan states that they should go for it anyway. Nathan and Lube make Rob go first, but Monique dies while performing oral sex on him. They panic and drive back to the USA. In an attempt to restore The Bible, Rob and his friends resolve to find all of the people who originally wrote it in order to recreate it, starting with the original creator, Noah Levenstein. They eventually succeed in recreating the book. Rob and his friends then go on the school ski trip. Nathan has sex with Dana in the lift control room and accidentally shut off the lifts' power, leaving his friends trapped.

Marshall Lube Lubetsky

 Portrayed by Brandon Hardesty
 Appeared in: American Pie Presents: The Book of Love
Marshall "Lube" Lubetsky is a fictional character from the American Pie series of teen comedy films. In class, Lube has a vivid fantasy about a group of cheerleaders, particularly one named Ashley. Lube tells Ashley how he feels about her, giving a speech on how he guarantees sexual satisfaction, but she still turns him down. Ashley's friend is impressed with his promise and tells Lube to meet her upstairs, but when she finds an offensive text on his phone she storms out. Rob finds Heidi in bed with Stifler and leaves the room. The next day, when Rob and Heidi are cleaning the library, Rob finds a secret compartment containing "The Bible". He shows the book to his friends Nathan and Lube and explains that it is a sex manual that has been compiled over 40 years by the students who found it. The book is regarded as legendary, but unfortunately has been damaged by the water. Lube discovers a page in The Bible which tells of a brothel in Canada and a prostitute, Monique, who is very experienced. The entry was written in 1975, but Lube misreads the date as 1995, and they decide to visit. When they meet Monique the boys are disgusted, but Nathan states that they should go for it anyway. Nathan and Lube make Rob go first, but Monique dies while performing oral sex on him. They panic and drive back to the USA. In an attempt to restore The Bible, Rob and his friends resolve to find all of the people who originally wrote it in order to recreate it, starting with the original creator, Noah Levenstein. They eventually succeed in recreating the book. Rob and his friends then go on the school ski trip. Lube and Diana are riding up the mountain in gondola ski lifts, but Nathan has sex with Dana in the lift control room and accidentally shut off the lifts' power. Ashley and Lube are in another lift, where Lube falls out when trying to go for help. When Ashley climbs down to him, Lube tells her how he really feels about her, moving her to tears. Lube and Ashley also go back to the cabin and have sex.

Heidi

 Portrayed by Beth Behrs
 Appeared in: American Pie Presents: The Book of Love
Heidi is a fictional character from the American Pie series of teen comedy films. She is the love interest of Rob, who after he talks to her Stifler states that if Rob doesn't make a move on Heidi, he will. Rob and Heidi meet later in the school library where she discloses that she is a virgin, and wishes to just "get it [sex] over with". Rob attempts to tell Heidi how he feels about her but is interrupted by Nathan and Lube. He eventually finds her in the library about to have sex with another student, and drops a lit candle in a bin in shock. This sets the library on fire, which sets off the water sprinklers. Heidi, Imogen and Dana spectate at a school basketball game where Rob again attempts to tell her how he feels, but is unable to. Rob and Heidi are once again in the library where Rob finally tells her he is attracted to her. Heidi says she feels the same, and they agree to meet at Stifler's party later. At the party Heidi hears Rob shout "Tonight, I'm getting laid!", and runs upstairs. Heidi follows him downstairs, but Rob refuses to talk to her and begins to drink heavily. She later goes on the school ski trip and while there she and Rob are riding up the mountain in gondola ski lifts, but Nathan has sex with Dana in the lift control room and accidentally shut off the lifts' power. Rob and Heidi reconcile and kiss. Heidi and Rob return to the cabin and have sex.

Dana
 Portrayed by Melanie Papalia
 Appeared in: American Pie Presents: The Book of Love
Dana is a fictional character from the American Pie series of teen comedy films. Dana is the love interest of Nathan and pledges to abstain from sex until marriage despite the fact that she has already slept with six other people. At the school dance, Nathan tries to get to second base with Dana, but only manages to offend her due to her abstinance pledge. Nathan goes to Dana's church service to talk to her, but accidentally broadcasts the explicit and highly personal conversation to the entire congregation on the church's PA system. Dana's father then bans Dana from seeing Nathan. Nathan attempts to reconcile with Dana but offends her, making her leave once again. When on the school ski trip Nathan has sex with Dana in the lift control room.

Ashley Lawrence
 Portrayed by Jennifer Holland
 Appeared in: American Pie Presents: The Book of Love
Ashley Lawrence is a fictional character from the American Pie series of teen comedy films. She is the love interest of Lube throughout the film. Lube tells her how he feels about her, giving a speech on how he guarantees sexual satisfaction, but she still turns him down. She goes on the school ski trip and while there she is riding up the mountain in gondola ski lift with Lube, but Nathan has sex with Dana in the lift control room and accidentally shut off the lifts' power. Lube falls out when trying to go for help. When Ashley climbs down to him, Lube tells her how he really feels about her, moving her to tears. Lube and Ashley also go back to the cabin and have sex.

Imogen
 Portrayed by Louisa Lytton
 Appeared in: American Pie Presents: The Book of Love
Imogen is a fictional character from the American Pie series of teen comedy films. She is a friend of Dana and Heidi's and splits from her long-term boyfriend off screen in the film. She later helps Scott after he is raped by a moose and while comforting him he touches her breast, although he tells her it was just reflex.

Characters from American Pie Presents: Girls' Rules

Annie Watson
 Portrayed by Madison Pettis
 Appeared in: American Pie Presents: Girls' Rules

Stephanie Stifler
 Portrayed by Lizze Broadway
 Appeared in: American Pie Presents: Girls' Rules

Stephanie is born into the infamous Stifler Family, Stephanie took up the prankster, sex-obsessed personality of her older cousins and became another chapter in the Stifler Legacy at East Great Falls. At some point, she met a young Emmett and the two became best friends. However, the friendship ended in fifth grade after Stephanie became mean and boisterous.

Kayla
 Portrayed by Piper Curda
 Appeared in: American Pie Presents: Girls' Rules

Michelle
 Portrayed by Natasha Behnam
 Appeared in: American Pie Presents: Girls' Rules

References

American Pie
American Pie (film series)